Patrick Graham VC (1837 – 3 June 1875) was born in St Michael's Parish, Dublin and was an Irish recipient of the Victoria Cross, the highest and most prestigious award for gallantry in the face of the enemy that can be awarded to British and Commonwealth forces.

Details
He was about 20 years old, and a private in the 90th Regiment of Foot (later The Cameronians (Scottish Rifles)), British Army during the Indian Mutiny when the following deed took place for which he was awarded the VC:

He died in Dublin on 3 June 1875. His Victoria Cross is displayed in the Cameronians Regimental Museum at Hamilton, Lanarkshire, Scotland.

References

The Register of the Victoria Cross (1981, 1988 and 1997)

Ireland's VCs  (Dept of Economic Development, 1995)
Monuments to Courage (David Harvey, 1999)
Irish Winners of the Victoria Cross (Richard Doherty & David Truesdale, 2000)

External links
Location of grave and VC medal (Dublin)

1837 births
1875 deaths
19th-century Irish people
Irish soldiers in the British Army
Military personnel from Dublin (city)
Cameronians soldiers
Irish recipients of the Victoria Cross
Indian Rebellion of 1857 recipients of the Victoria Cross
British Army recipients of the Victoria Cross
Burials in Dublin (county)